This is a list of members of City Council of Tehran:

Members

Fifth Council members (2017–2021)

Fourth Council members (2013–2017)

Third Council members (2007–2013)

Second Council members (2003–2007)

First Council members (1999–2003)

See also
 List of mayors of Tehran
 Timeline of Tehran

References

City Council of Tehran members
Government of Tehran
City Council
Members of City Council of Tehran